The Player is a 2004 American reality television program broadcast on UPN in which several men compete with each other using their "player skills" to seduce an attractive woman. The woman for the show's only season was Dawn Olivieri.

The program is hosted by phone by the "Ultimate Player" until the end of the series, when his identity is revealed to be Rob Mariano from Survivor.

References

External links

UPN original programming
2000s American reality television series
2004 American television series debuts
2004 American television series endings
American dating and relationship reality television series
Television shows set in Florida